Großraming is a municipality in the district of Steyr-Land in the Austrian state of Upper Austria.

Geography
Großraming lies in the Traunviertel. The Enns river flows through the municipality. About 71 percent of the municipality is forest, and 23 percent is farmland.

References

Cities and towns in Steyr-Land District